The 2012 Jacksonville Dolphins football team represented Jacksonville University in the 2012 NCAA Division I FCS football season. They were led by sixth-year head coach Kerwin Bell and played their home games at D. B. Milne Field. They are a member of the Pioneer Football League. They finished the season 7–4, 5–3 in PFL play to finish in a tie for fourth place.

Schedule

Source: Schedule

References

Jacksonville
Jacksonville Dolphins football seasons
Jacksonville Dolphins football